Elections to the Atyrau Regional Mäslihat were held on 10 January 2021. Voters elected all 31 members of the Atyrau Regional Mäslihat for the first time using proportional representation system to allocate all the seats in the mäslihat.

The Nur Otan (NO) secured a majority of 25 seats while two parties Ak Zhol Democratic Party (AJ) and Auyl People's Democratic Patriotic Party (AUYL) had managed to secure to earn the certain required 7% electoral threshold to win each 3 seats.

Background 
Election date was set in October 2020 for all local and Mazhilis races, including the 31 seats in the Atyrau Regional Mäslihat as the 6th convocation's term was set to expire in January 2021. The new Regional Mäslihat was composed of party members elected through the newly implemented party-list proportional representation electoral system from 2018.

On 18 November 2020, the Atyrau Regional Branch of the Nur Otan party presented its list of candidates to the Regional Mäslihat as well as pre-election campaign with relation to the economy of the region.

Parties 
Four parties submitted their lists to the Atyrau Regional Electoral Commission which were registered by 12 December 2020.

Results

By district

Overall

References 

2021 elections in Kazakhstan